Cristobal López may refer to:

Cristóvão Lopes, Portuguese painter, known as "Cristóbal López" in Spain
Cristóbal López (18th century), Spanish painter
Cristóbal López (soccer player), Chilean footballer
Cristóbal López (businessman), Argentine businessman